Brinkworth is a surname. Notable people with the surname include:

Bob Brinkworth (born 1942), Canadian ice hockey player and coach
E. R. C. Brinkworth (1901–1978), British historian
Norman Brinkworth (born 1944), Pakistani hurdler
Rex Brinkworth, (1929–1998), British philanthropist